Mayflower School District (MSD)  is a public school district based in Mayflower, Faulkner County, Arkansas, United States. MSD supports more than 1,100 students in prekindergarten through grade 12 by employing more than 150 faculty and staff on a full time equivalent basis for its three schools.

The school district encompasses  of land in Faulkner County and serves all of Mayflower and portions of Sherwood, Jacksonville, Conway, and Vilonia.

Schools 
 Mayflower High School, serving grades 9 through 12.
 Mayflower Middle School, serving grades 5 through 8.
 Mayflower Ełementary School, serving prekindergarten through grade 4.

References

External links

Education in Faulkner County, Arkansas
School districts in Arkansas